The LNW-80, released in 1982, is the first computer built by LNW Research. The computer is 100% compatible with the Tandy TRS-80 Model 1, but has some hardware enhancements. Most notable are the high-resolution color graphics, which could also be used for an 80×24 screen, with a special software driver (TRS-80 is 64×16, while 80×24 is the screen size most CP/M software needed). Other enhancements were high processor speed (4 MHz), color support, and optionally, CP/M support. The LNW-80 was also sold as a kit.
  
The LNW supported four screen modes:
 Mode 0 is the default TRS-80 screen with 64×16 characters, and 128×48 semi graphics.
 Mode 1 is 480×192 monochrome.
 Mode 2 uses high-resolution graphics memory to colorize the mode 0 graphics. This results in 128×48 dots with 8 colors per dot. This mode could be used to 'colorize' the standard TRS-80 games when loaded with special software.
 Mode 3 uses low res character memory to colorize the high res pixels. This results in 384×192 pixels on 128×48 color fields. Per color field, a foreground and background color is selected from the basic eight colors. The colors are white, green, yellow, red, magenta, blue, blue-green and black.

LNW Research 

LNW Research started by making third party extensions for the Tandy TRS-80 model 1 market. They started in 1979 or 1980 with a System Extension, a D.I.Y. kit replacement of the Tandy Expansion Interface. The LNW80 appeared at the end of 1980. Later came the LNDoubler, a high quality double density adapter in 1981. 1983 saw the LNW II, an upgrade of the LNW80 capable of running CP/M and the LNW Team, which included an Intel 8088 board for MS-DOS compatibility. The company folded due to bankruptcy in 1984.

External links
 LNW80 Main Page, Galaxy of Features

Home computers
Z80-based home computers
TRS-80